is a Japanese professional golfer.

Tsukada plays on the Japan Golf Tour and the Asian Tour. His best finish on the Japan Golf Tour is a win at the 2013 Token Homemate Cup. His best finish on the Asian Tour is T-2 at the 2009 Queen's Cup. He won two events on the Japan Challenge Tour in 2016 and led the money list.

Professional wins (3)

Japan Golf Tour wins (1)

Japan Challenge Tour wins (2)

Results in major championships

CUT = missed the halfway cut
Note: Tsukada never played in the Masters Tournament or the PGA Championship.

References

External links

Japanese male golfers
Japan Golf Tour golfers
Sportspeople from Chiba Prefecture
1969 births
Living people